Impétueux was a  74-gun ship of the line of the French Navy. Launched at Lorient, France, on 24 January 1803 as Brutus, she was renamed Impétueux on 5 February 1803.

Impétueux served in the Caribbean under Jean-Baptiste Philibert Willaumez during the Atlantic campaign of 1806.

On 19 August 1806, Impétueux was dismasted in a storm and drifted until 10 September 1806. Her wreck was set ablaze by the British and the crew was taken prisoner.

See also
 List of ships of the line of France

References

Ships of the line of the French Navy
Téméraire-class ships of the line
1803 ships
Ships built in France
Maritime incidents in 1806
Shipwrecks in the Chesapeake Bay